Adzera (also spelled Atzera, Azera, Atsera, Acira) is an Austronesian language spoken by about 30,000 people in Morobe Province, Papua New Guinea.

Dialects
Holzknecht (1989) lists six Adzera dialects.

 Central dialect chain: 9,950 speakers
 Amari dialect: 5,350 speakers
 Ngarowapum dialect: 1,200 speakers
 Yaros dialect: 2,200 speakers
 Guruf / Ngariawang dialect: 1,550 speakers
 Tsumanggorun dialect: 400 speakers

Sukurum is spoken in the villages of Sukurum, Rumrinan, Gabagiap, Gupasa, Waroum, and Wangat in Wantoat/Leron Rural LLG.

Sarasira is spoken in the villages of Sarasira, Som, Pukpuk, Saseang, and Sisuk in Wantoat/Leron Rural LLG. Sarasira and Som share the same speech variety.

Phonology

Vowels

The diphthongs  occur, while other sequences of vowels are split over two syllables.

 does not occur in the Amari and Ngarowapum dialects.

Consonants

 occurs in only one word: the interjection hai "yes".

The prenasalized consonants tend to lose prenasalization initially and after consonants.

Writing system

J, o and z are used in some loanwords and names.

The letter ŋ was replaced by the digraph ng in the 2015 orthography.

Grammar

Negation

Simple negation 
Simple negation in Adzera is achieved by the word imaʔ 'no'. This word can be used on its own in response to a question, or paired with a negative sentence. For example:

The Amari dialect of Adzera is specifically noted for its use of namu for 'no' where all other Adzera dialects would use imaʔ. however, in Amari both words can be used interchangeably.

Negation of a noun phrase 
The simple negative forms above can be used in a noun phrase after the noun to modify it. Such as mamaʔ namu 'No children'. This can also apply to a coordinated noun phrase, such as iyam da ifab 'dog and pig' where iyam da ifab namu would mean that there were no dogs and no pigs.

Negation of a verb phrase 
Most negation is done through the verb phrase. For general circumstances, verbal negation is achieved by a verbal prefix anuŋʔ- And an optional negation particle u at the end of the sentence. For example:

However, for verbs in the imperative or hortative forms, which take a prefix wa- or na- respectively, the negative is achieved by replacing their respective prefixes with a negative form ma- followed at the end of the sentence by a compulsory particle maʔ.

Coordinated verb negation 
When two negative verbs or phrases are joined by da ‘and’ the first verb takes the negative prefix anuŋʔ-, and the negative particle u comes at the end of the whole sentence.

Negation with future tense 
When negating a sentence in the future tense, the future tense prefix is replaced with the realis prefix. Any future time marking still remains. There is also a preference toward forming negative sentences in the future tense with an auxiliary verb saŋʔ 'be able, be enough' before the main verb of the sentence, suggesting a reluctance toward making negative statements about the future. For example:

When coordinating two sentences of future tense, the first verb phrase replaces the future prefix with the realis, but all following verb phrases retain their future tense marking.

List of abbreviations 
see List of Glossing Abbreviations. 

Below is a list of Grammatical abbreviations used throughout this article:

COMP:completive

References

Further reading

 
 
 
 
 
 
 
 

Markham languages
Languages of Morobe Province